Brady Gollan (born 28 March 1965) is a Canadian former professional snooker player.

Career

Born in 1965, Gollan turned professional in 1989 through the Professional Play-offs, the tour qualifying event at the time, where he beat Patsy Fagan 9–2 in his third-round match.

In Gollan's first season as a professional he recorded three last-32 finishes - at the 1989 Hong Kong Open, the 1989 Asian Open and the 1990 World Snooker Championship - and reached the last 16 at one tournament, the 1989 UK Championship. In Hong Kong, Dennis Taylor defeated Gollan 5–4, while Willie Thorne defeated him 5–1 at the Asian Open. His run at the UK Championship, encompassing victories over Dave Martin and Eddie Charlton, concluded with a 5–9 loss to Alain Robidoux.

At the World Championship in 1990, he overcame Clive Everton 10–2, Paul Gibson 10–5, Kirk Stevens 10–6, Brian Morgan 10–6 and Eugene Hughes 10–7 to qualify for the main stages at the Crucible Theatre for the first time. There, he was drawn against the resurgent Doug Mountjoy but, despite leading 4–2 and 8–7, could not prevent an 8–10 loss. Gollan finished the season ranked 54th, automatically retaining his place for the next.

During that season, Gollan reached the last 32 at the 1990 Asian Open - losing 4–5 to Mountjoy - and the 1991 British Open, where Taylor whitewashed him 5–0. He suffered a 0–7 loss to Jimmy White at the 1991 World Masters, but recorded the best performance of his career at the 1991 European Open, where he defeated Mike Darrington, Bob Chaperon, James Wattana, Peter Francisco and Mountjoy to reach the semi-finals. He lost 2–6 to the eventual champion Tony Jones, but the £12,000 earned from this finish was the highest of his career. His attempt to feature again at the Crucible was ended by a 6–10 defeat to Barry Pinches, but Gollan ended the season ranked 35th.

In the 1991/1992 season, Gollan lost in the last 32 at the Dubai Classic, 2–5 to Joe Johnson and the last 16 at the 1992 Strachan Open, by the same scoreline to Ken Doherty, and his World Championship run ended with a 1–10 loss to Andy Hicks in his first match.

The following season brought only four match wins and three last-64 finishes, and Gollan ended it ranked 68th. After a 1–5 defeat to Dermot McGlinchey in the 1994 British Open, he did not play again at competitive level; he remained registered as a 'non-active' professional, but was eventually relegated from the tour in 1996.

Career finals

Team finals: 1

Amateur finals: 2 (2 titles)

References

Canadian snooker players
1965 births
Living people
Place of birth missing (living people)